The Marcus Meyer Skinner House, also known as the Howorth House, is a historic house in Selma, Dallas County, Alabama.  The large two-story Tudor Revival-style house was built in 1928 for Marcus Meyer Skinner, a renowned surgeon and native of nearby Furman.  It was designed by one of Alabama's leading architects of the day, Frank Lockwood.

Architectural historians consider the house to be an excellent example of early 20th century
domestic Tudor Revival architecture and among the best examples of the style in the Black Belt region of Alabama.  It was added to National Register of Historic Places on August 27, 1987.

References

There were a group of black kids discovered the house again 2020, and found papers outside and was able to connect to a woman who was able to give them exiting and spooky news!

National Register of Historic Places in Dallas County, Alabama
Tudor Revival architecture in Alabama
Houses completed in 1928
Houses on the National Register of Historic Places in Alabama
Houses in Dallas County, Alabama